Neuville-les-Dames is a commune in the Ain department in eastern France.

Population

See also
Communes of the Ain department
Dombes

References

External links

 La Dombes and the city of Neuville-les-Dames

Communes of Ain
Ain communes articles needing translation from French Wikipedia